Adekunle Abdulkabir Akinlade  (born 9 October 1969) is a Nigerian politician. He represented Egbado South and Ipokia federal constituency in the House of Representatives. He left the All Progressive Congress and joined the Allied Peoples Movement to run for Governor of Ogun State in the 2019 election.

Early life
Akinlade was born in Ipadilpopo Compound at Agosasa, Ipokia Local Government Area of Ogun State. He spent his early years travelling across the country with his father.

Politics
He was appointed Senior Special Assistant on  Taxation and Revenue in July 2011. In this capacity, he oversaw the state Directorate of other Taxes at the Board of Internal Revenue Services (IRS). He joined the All Progressive Congress in the 2015 general elections to represent Egbado south and Ipokia at the federal house of representatives. He defected to the Allied Peoples Movement to run in the 2019 governorship election, after failing to secure the APC nomination, which he lost to Dapo Abiodun.

Personal life
Akinlade married Chinenye Ochuba, a former  Most Beautiful Girl in Nigeria and Miss World Africa, in 2008.

References 

1969 births
Living people
Yoruba politicians
Lagos State University alumni
All Progressives Congress politicians
21st-century Nigerian politicians
People from Ogun State